Dulegaunda  is a town and market center in Shuklagandaki Municipality in Tanahun District in the Gandaki Zone of central Nepal. The formerly Village Development Committee was merged to form the new municipality since 18 May 2014. At the time of the 1991 Nepal census it had a population of 7412 people living in 1507 individual households.

References

External links
UN map of the municipalities of Tanahu District

Populated places in Tanahun District